Pierre Margot is a Swiss forensics scientist known for his contribution to the invention of the first forensic light source Polilight for the detection of fingerprint, biological fluids and other evidence on the crime scene. This new technology was named by the Powerhouse Museum as one of the top 100 Australian innovations of the 20th century. It was a great revolution in the field of forensic identification since this light could be used at the crime scene, unlike lasers at that time.

Biography
Pierre Margot was born in Delémont (Switzerland) on 25 February 1950. He obtained his degree in forensic science and criminology at the University of Lausanne in 1974. He then get his master's degree (1977) and PhD (1980) in forensic science at the University of Strathclyde, Glasgow, Scotland. He then continues post-doctoral studies in toxicology in Salt Lake City, Utah. In 1986, he became the fourth director of the Institute of Forensic Science and Criminology (IPSC) of the University of Lausanne; he has been on charged until 2016. During his career, he has contributed to numerous articles in forensic journals, wrote many books and book chapters, and also give several lectures worldwide.

Work
Because of his expertise in forensics, Pierre Margot has worked on several international issues. In 1972, he participated, in Northern Ireland, to the investigation of the Bloody Sunday with Doug Lucas and Peter Forest. He then continued his international involvement in 1985, during his participation in the investigation of the Sinking of the Rainbow Warrior. In 1989, while working at the Australian National University in Canberra, Australia, he participated (with Ron Warrener, Hilton Kobus, Milutin Stoilovic and Chris Lennard) to the invention of the Polilight. He participated, among other during his career, to the investigation of the massacres of the Order of the Solar Temple (1994–1997) in Canada and in Suisse as well as on the Omagh bombing in Northern Ireland (1998, with Doug Lucas and Peter Forest).

Distinctions

 2004: Merentibus Award — Krakov (Poland) – higher distinction awarded by the Institute of Forensic Research
 2010: Recognition Award – Rofin Forensic (Australia) – for the development of the Polilight
 2011: Douglas M. Lucas Award – American Academy of Forensic Sciences
 2013: Doctorate honoris causa of the Université du Québec à Trois-Rivières
 2014: John A. Dondero Memorial Award of the International Association for Identification
2014: Nominated to the French Forensic Science Hall of Fame of the Association Québécoise de Criminalistique

Scientific groups
 Switzerland representative and member of the International Association for Identification
 Member of the Swiss Chamber of technical legal experts and scientists
 Honorary member of the Forensic Science Society (UK)
 Fellow of the American Academy of Forensic Sciences
 Member of the Association québécoise de criminalistique (Canada)
 Member of the Jura Institute of Sciences, Letters and Arts

Books
Kuhn A., Schwarzenegger C., Margot P., Donatsch A., Aebi M.F., Jositsch D. (eds.), Criminology, Criminal Policy and Criminal Law in an International Perspective: essays in honour of Martin Killias on the occasion of his 65th birthday. Stämpfli, Bern, 2013.
Champod C, Lennard C, Margot P, Stoilovic M, Fingerprints and Other Ridge Skin Impressions. CRC Press, Boca Raton, 2004.

References

Forensic scientists
Living people
1950 births
20th-century scientists
University of Lausanne alumni
Academic staff of the University of Lausanne